The Orlando International Airport Intermodal Terminal or South Airport Intermodal Terminal is an intermodal transit complex under construction at the Orlando International Airport in Orlando, Florida. The new station, which is partially being funded by the Florida Department of Transportation, will serve as the Orlando station for the Brightline inter-city rail service, which will connect Orlando International Airport to downtown Miami via the Florida East Coast Railway. The terminal building and the adjacent parking garage opened on November 17, 2017, while work on the train terminal continues.

History 
The facility mostly reuses plans from the proposed Florida High Speed Rail system. In that plan, the Orlando International Airport station was to be the northern terminus of the initial Tampa-to-Orlando route along Interstate 4. The plan was effectively cancelled when Florida governor Rick Scott announced he would reject federal funding for the project. The Greater Orlando Aviation Authority had already invested considerably to accommodate the station and high-speed rail line, such as the extra length of the south taxiway bridges over the southern airport access road, which will now be used by Brightline. As part of the $684 million intermodal complex, the airport authority has also built a 2,400 space parking garage.

Future use 
The SunRail commuter rail line is also considering a  extension to the airport terminal. The extension would travel  from the existing SunRail line along an Orlando Utilities Commission rail spur, which runs along the southern boundary of the airport's property. The route is used exclusively by coal trains to serve the Curtis H. Stanton Energy Center in eastern Orange County. From there, two options are currently under consideration; one plan would have SunRail trains branch north off of the existing OUC line and onto a new  spur that would terminate at the planned South Airport Intermodal Terminal. The second option being explored would be to build a transfer station along the OUC line where passengers would transfer from SunRail trains onto light rail trains that would run along a dedicated 2-mile line between the transfer and airport stations.

In addition to Brightline and SunRail, the station might also serve one of two proposed rail connections to International Drive. There were plans for an elevated maglev train system, but those were scrapped in 2015. The current plan is for a light rail line that would most likely connect the airport and with the Orange County Convention Center, Florida Mall, and the Sand Lake Road SunRail station before reaching International Drive.

See also 
Miami Intermodal Center

References

External links 
Orlando – Brightline

2017 establishments in Florida
Airport railway stations in the United States
Brightline stations
Buildings and structures in Orlando, Florida
Bus stations in Florida
Intermodal Terminal
Passenger rail transportation in Florida
Proposed public transportation in Florida
Railway stations scheduled to open in 2023
SunRail
Transportation buildings and structures in Orange County, Florida
Transportation in Orlando, Florida
Railway stations under construction in the United States
Transport infrastructure completed in 2017